White Collar Zen is a project by Steven Heine, who is primarily known for his research on medieval Japanese religion and society. The project deals with the principles of Zen Buddhism in relation to the contemporary workplace and professional leadership issues. White Collar Zen demonstrates how to incorporate Zen principles into daily work life in order to achieve professional success.

In addition to the book – White Collar Zen: Using Zen Principles to Overcome Obstacles and Achieve Your Goal (Oxford University Press, 2005) – White Collar Zen is a multi-faceted project that includes a unique course on Asian Cultural Values in Business sponsored by the Eugenio Pino Entrepreneurship Center at Florida International University, as well as workshops and conferences on ancient Asian wisdom and modern business.

The Asian Cultural Values in Business course was first taught in fall 2006. On November 17, 2006, a conference was held titled From East to West and West to East. It included four panels that discussed how Asia has influenced the way the West does business and vice versa, and included such topics as Asian investment and international issues, leadership in a global perspective, and Asian cultural values and entrepreneurship. The panels featured student presentations from the Asian Cultural Values in Business course and various other speakers. Among them were authors of business negotiations in Asia: Mark McNeilly (Sun Tzu and the Art of Business: Six Strategic Principles for Managers), Bill Diffenderffer (The Samurai Leader), and Kaihan Krippendorff (The Art of Advantage: 36 Strategies to Seize the Competitive Edge).

How to Tell a Buddha from a Fox
In Asia, the mythical Fox is the primary symbol of how one can become entangled in a web of misunderstanding. The Fox, which appears to its unwitting victim in human form, represents the deception and duplicity that brings with it self-doubt and frustrates the pursuit of aspirations. It is a symbol of undesirable tendencies, such as chasing after unattainable aims while leaving important parts of life unattended. Along with Foxes who deceive, however, there are always the Buddhas who are eager to support, not because of personal ties or loyalty, but because they objectively evaluate the merits and demerits of a situation. Both the Fox and the Buddha are often disguised and each tries to pass as the other for strategic purposes. Distinguishing between them is a valuable skill. As decisions hang in the balance, the Unmoving Mind is a tool to separate truth or authenticity from illusion or untruth. Illusion renders you vulnerable to anxiety and confusion and unable to react to critical situations with clarity and lucidity.

Elevation–Purification–Activation
The process of Elevation-Purification-Activation (EPA) cultivates four basic levels of human consciousness: feeling or emotion, speaking or communication, thinking or logic, and knowing or intuitive awareness. When one is controlled by emotions, his or her actions become hasty and s/he is likely to say something inappropriate. The key is to elevate and purify one's feelings so that they are balanced and objective.

In attaining the Hermit's objective, one can effectively bring about constructive change. Tamed emotions are transmuted into the foundation of productive understanding. Such an understanding enables one to act with the Warrior's effortless, spontaneous creativity.

The Hermit and the Warrior
Heine describes how Zen embraces two different and seemingly contradictory yet harmonious paths of behavior. The Way of the Hermit teaches detachment – the mental clarity you need to view your situation dispassionately and impartially, to perceive who is a friend and who is an enemy, to understand what is possible and what is not. The Way of the Warrior teaches the ability to act without hesitation and at the appropriate moment. Together, the ways can prepare one to meet the challenges of the modern world of business.

Both ways can be applied to contemporary affairs.  The Warrior is always on the move and is able to establish a base of power while transient. The shifts and transitions do not conflict, but in the end enhance the Warrior's abilities. The Hermit is also in a state of continuing transition. A hermit gains strength through passivity, standing back from conflict, looking at things clearly and objectively, and remaining noncommittal until it is absolutely necessary to react. He aggressively pursues passivity by moving, not standing still and seeking out areas and arenas where constructive passivity can best be applied.

The Warrior is dynamic, assertive and taking a stand. A Hermit is also dynamic in his own way by actively not taking a stand. In integrating the Warrior and Hermit approaches, Zen training provides a timely new paradigm for being clear in thoughts and disciplined in actions to establish harmonious interpersonal relations and attain mutually beneficial goals.

Encounter vs. Confrontation
A key objective is to transform dysfunctional conflicts (or Confrontations) rife with antagonism and turmoil into creative negotiations (or Encounters) characterized by shared purposes and cooperation. In a Confrontation, words do not ease tensions or have a reforming impact but cause the basic inflexibility of structure to tighten. It is characterized by personal will and gain, divisiveness, threats, and demands.  It results in a direct challenge based on alternating aggressive and passive attitudes which lead to conflict and discord.

A Confrontation compounds futility and leads to further misunderstanding, whereas an Encounter is a productive form of negotiation with mutually beneficial results. Through negotiations, agreements, and ongoing teamwork, one can use indirect methods to reach goals by creating situations that facilitate cooperation. Both approaches involve some kind of meeting but the former, by being one-dimensional in attitude, fails to mobilize multiple factors of constructive engagement.

The Four Steps
The Four Steps are a means of developing self-discipline and self-control to overcome obstacles at the workplace and achieve success in the professional world through an Encounter. By cultivating the Unmoving Mind and by applying the methods discussed in White Collar Zen, one is able to deal with professional challenges:

Step 1: Recognize a Crisis in Structure
Recognize a crisis in the structure of the work organizational environment and work through channels by investigating the roots of the problem, but without jumping to conclusions in either blaming others or remaining unassertive.

Step 2: Use Words Creatively
Speak creatively to alter perceptions and receptivity regarding a problem in organizational structure by getting one's message across effectively. One persuades not because of self-interest, but based on genuine commitment to ideals and goals.

Step 3: Silence as a Tool for Strategic Planning
Move beyond reliance on words by knowing when to refrain from speaking if verbal communication falls short, and let events take a natural course through waiting patiently yet without becoming overly passive.

Step 4: Enter the Realm of Anti-Structure
When both words and no-words fail, a more inventive form of White Collar Zen is required, which is found in the fourth step, the path of anti-structure. Awakening the Unmoving Mind empowers you to cross over invisible lines of hierarchy and division. Seize the moment for a bold, break the rules anti-structural expression that is based on integrity and responsibility. Cutting through structure involves taking risks but can be appropriate and conducive to progressive interaction and growth.  There are times when the attitudes or behavior of Zen masters are unpredictable and even outrageous in questioning authority that is arbitrary and therefore oppressive.  A famous saying is, "If you see the Buddha on the road, kill the Buddha."  This approach relinquishes any attachment to security and safety and takes a Zen master's leap from a 100-foot pole.

External links
 Steven Heine
 White Collar Zen
 Harvard Business School

Florida International University
Buddhist education
Management education
Zen in the United States